Xestagonum is a genus of beetles in the family Carabidae, containing the following species:

 Xestagonum ahrensi J. Schmidt, 1995
 Xestagonum alanstivelli Morvan, 1999
 Xestagonum alticola J. Schmidt, 1998
 Xestagonum ambiguum Fairmaire, 1891
 Xestagonum ambulator Andrewes, 1930
 Xestagonum arvarum Morvan, 1996
 Xestagonum baehri J. Schmidt, 1996
 Xestagonum bellasilviae J. Schmidt, 1996
 Xestagonum benesi Morvan, 1996
 Xestagonum beskellum Morvan, 1996
 Xestagonum bhutanense Morvan, 1982
 Xestagonum blevennek Morvan, 1998
 Xestagonum bochkrizet Morvan, 1999
 Xestagonum bothoreli Morvan, 1999
 Xestagonum brancuccii J. Schmidt, 1997
 Xestagonum brunicolle J. Schmidt, 1995
 Xestagonum bruskornecum Morvan, 1996
 Xestagonum bureli Morvan, 1995
 Xestagonum cavazzutii Morvan, 1998
 Xestagonum chensicieni (Kryzhanovskij, 1994)
 Xestagonum convexicolle J. Schmidt, 1997
 Xestagonum cursor Andrewes, 1930
 Xestagonum daisetsuzanum Nakane, 1963
 Xestagonum daoublev Morvan, 1999
 Xestagonum deuvei Morvan, 1998
 Xestagonum deuvesianum Morvan, 1995
 Xestagonum dierli Jedlicka, 1966
 Xestagonum diversicolle J. Schmidt, 1995
 Xestagonum dobbertini J. Schmidt, 1998
 Xestagonum etainn Morvan, 1996
 Xestagonum ganesh Morvan, 1996
 Xestagonum gellkistinum Morvan, 1996
 Xestagonum gorapaniense Habu, 1973
 Xestagonum grandistyle J. Schmidt, 1996
 Xestagonum habui J. Schmidt, 1996
 Xestagonum hauseri Jedlicka, 1931
 Xestagonum henvelikum Morvan, 1996
 Xestagonum himalayae Habu, 1973
 Xestagonum holzschuhi Morvan, 1996
 Xestagonum holzschuhianum Morvan, 1996
 Xestagonum immarginatum J. Schmidt, 1997
 Xestagonum inexspactatum Kryzhanovskij, 1994
 Xestagonum izeldoareum Morvan, 1996
 Xestagonum jannuense (Jedlicka, 1968)
 Xestagonum kalchmoanum Morvan, 1996
 Xestagonum kamaretianum Morvan, 1995
 Xestagonum karli J. Schmidt, 1998
 Xestagonum karvanekum Morvan, 1996
 Xestagonum kemm Morvan, 1999
 Xestagonum kergreni Morvan, 1999
 Xestagonum korr Morvan, 1999
 Xestagonum kuzonduresti Morvan, 1995
 Xestagonum lagadbihan Morvan, 1999
 Xestagonum lassallei Morvan, 1995
 Xestagonum lassalleianum Morvan, 1995
 Xestagonum lehirae Morvan, 1999
 Xestagonum marani Jedlicka, 1968
 Xestagonum marginalis Morvan, 1999
 Xestagonum meneziadum Morvan, 1996
 Xestagonum modron Morvan, 1995
 Xestagonum montuosella J. Schmidt, 1998
 Xestagonum montuosum Habu, 1973
 Xestagonum morholt Morvan, 1996
 Xestagonum musculum Jedlicka, 1965
 Xestagonum naviauxi Morvan, 1995
 Xestagonum nepalense Jedlicka, 1965
 Xestagonum nitouense Jedlicka, 1934
 Xestagonum nivium Bates, 1891
 Xestagonum pavruzum Morvan, 1996
 Xestagonum pennboullek Morvan, 1999
 Xestagonum plurisetosum Kryzhanovskij & Jedlicka, 1994
 Xestagonum remondi Morvan, 1999
 Xestagonum rhiannon Morvan, 1996
 Xestagonum ruteri Morvan, 1972
 Xestagonum semiaeneum (Fairmaire, 1886)
 Xestagonum semicoeruleum J. Schmidt, 1995
 Xestagonum shimomurai Morvan, 1996
 Xestagonum sikkimensis Morvan, 1998
 Xestagonum skoazigum Morvan, 1996
 Xestagonum skoazkornek Morvan, 1999
 Xestagonum smetanai Morvan, 1996
 Xestagonum soazigae Morvan, 1999
 Xestagonum szekessyi Jedlicka, 1960
 Xestagonum szetschuanense Jedlicka, 1934
 Xestagonum tetrasetosum Habu, 1973
 Xestagonum tharepatiense Habu, 1973
 Xestagonum torgos Morvan, 1998
 Xestagonum treutikum Morvan, 1996
 Xestagonum ursulae J. Schmidt, 1998
 Xestagonum venator Andrewes, 1930
 Xestagonum vignai J. Schmidt, 1998
 Xestagonum xestum (Bates, 1883)
 Xestagonum yanfoueri Morvan, 1996

References

Platyninae